Beosus maritimus is a species of dirt-colored seed bug in the family Rhyparochromidae, found mainly in Europe and western Asia.

Subspecies
These four subspecies belong to the species Beosus maritimus:
 Beosus maritimus buyssoni Montandon, 1889
 Beosus maritimus maritimus Scopoli, 1763
 Beosus maritimus ochraceus Wagner, 1949
 Beosus maritimus sphragadimium (Fieber, 1861)

References

External links

 

Rhyparochromidae
Hemiptera of Europe
Insects described in 1763